Vroon is a surname. Notable people with the surname include:

Donald Vroon (born 1942), American musicologist
Peter Vroon (1917–1997), American politician